La Liberación is Brazilian band CSS's third studio album. It is their last album with guitarist Adriano Cintra, who left the band in November 2011.

Track listing
All tracks composed by Adriano Cintra/Lovefoxxx, unless noted otherwise.

"I Love You" – 3:48
"Hits Me Like a Rock (featuring Bobby Gillespie) – 3:37
"City Grrrl" (featuring Ssion) (Adriano Cintra/Lovefoxxx/Cody Critcheloe) – 4:24
"Echo of Love" (Cintra/Lovefoxxx/Ana Anjos) – 3:47
"You Could Have It All" – 3:45
"La Liberación" (Cintra) – 2:13
"Partners in Crime" (featuring Mike Garson) – 4:12
"Ruby Eyes" – 2:46
"Rhythm to the Rebels" – 3:37
"Red Alert" (featuring Ratatat) – 3:28
"Fuck Everything" (Lovefoxxx/Carolina Parra) – 5:32

Singles
The first single is "Hits Me Like a Rock", which features Primal Scream singer Bobby Gillespie.

Personnel
 Ana Anjos – group member, lyricist
 Adriano Cintra – group member, composer, lyricist, producer, engineer, mixer
 Cody Critcheloe – vocals, lyricist
 Hana Dayies – photography
 Mike Garson – piano
 Bobby Gillespie – vocals
 Nahor Gomes – trumpet
 Hélio Leite – assistant mixer
 Lovefoxxx – group member, lyricist, artwork, handwriting, layout
 Tuco Marcondes – acoustic guitar
 Carolina Parra – group member, composer, mixer
 Ronaldão – assistant mixer
 Luiza Sá – group member, photography
 Rodrigo Sanches – acoustic drums, engineer, mixer

Charts

References

External links
 https://www.nme.com/news/css/56944
 http://csshurtssuxxx.blogspot.com/2011/04/so-you-probably-already-know-this-but.html
 https://web.archive.org/web/20121021171249/http://www.nme.com/blog/index.php?blog=140&title=css_la_liberacion_first_listen&more=1&c=1&tb=1&pb=1

2011 albums
CSS (band) albums